Shay Aharon (born 12 October 1978) is a retired Israeli footballer who is most known for playing with Hapoel Jerusalem and Hapoel Katamon Jerusalem.

Career
At the age of 19, Aharon made his debut for the senior side of Hapoel Jerusalem. From there on he became one of the most important players for the club as he was the main goalscorer for Hapoel. He is regarded as an icon in Hapoel Jerusalem.

On 3 May 2010 he was appointed as the manager of Hapoel while still an active player in the club. Later that month he decided to leave the club after he had enough of the way the club was operating.

On June 21, 2010, Aharon joined the fan-owned football club Hapoel Katamon Jerusalem. He played there for five seasons and scored 56 goals.

On June 26, 2014, Aharon retired from the game and became the general manager of Katamon. On May 1, 2015, Aharon came back to play his last game in which he scored a goal and celebrated the club's second promotion to the Liga Leumit.

Honours
Liga Artzit (2):
2001-02, 2007-08
Liga Artzit - 2007-08 Top Goalscorer (13 goals)
Liga Bet (1):
2010-11
Liga Alef (1):
2012-13

References

External links

1978 births
Living people
Israeli footballers
Footballers from Jerusalem
Hapoel Jerusalem F.C. players
Maccabi Petah Tikva F.C. players
Hakoah Maccabi Ramat Gan F.C. players
Hapoel Ashkelon F.C. players
Hapoel Katamon Jerusalem F.C. players
Liga Leumit players
Israeli people of Yemeni-Jewish descent
Association football forwards